Street Corner Justice is a 1996 American action film directed by Chuck Bail and starring Marc Singer.

Cast
Marc Singer as Mike Justus
Steve Railsback as Ryan Freeborn
Kim Lankford as Jenny Connor
Beverly Leech as Willie Gee
Tom Lister Jr. as Angel Aikens
Soon-Tek Oh as Kwong Chuck Lee
Bryan Cranston as Father Brophy

Reception
William Thomas of Empire awarded the film two stars out of five.

References

External links
 
 

American action films
1996 action films
1996 films
1990s English-language films
1990s American films